Feiern is a 2006 documentary film about the electronic dance music scene (e.g., house music, techno). Maja Classen wrote and directed the film.

Synopsis 
The film features people from Berlin's electronic dance music scenes (primarily house music and techno, but especially their “minimal” sub-scenes). The majority of the film consists of footage of individual interviews, cut and interpolated together to create narratives around certain themes, such as music, drugs, love, addiction, friendship, and sexuality. Among the interviewees were DJs, bouncers, bartenders, and partygoers.

The material for the film included 19 interviews, 56 nights (i.e., nighttime music events), and 13 musical tracks.

Production and release 
The film was made under the direction of Maja Classen, with cinematography by Andreas Bergmann and editing by Sylke Rohrlach. The poetic prose that opens and closes the film was written by German author, playwright, and essayist Rainald Goetz.

The film premiered on the March 22, 2006 in the Kino Babylon Theater in Berlin. Afterwards, it was shown in several film festivals, including achtung berlin—new film award and the 44th Gijon International Film Festival in Spain. On November 3, 2006, the record label interGroove Tonträger Vertriebs GmbH released the film for DVD distribution under the title Feiern with a 16-year licensing term. The DVD was distributed with a free CD that included music from the film's soundtrack.

Soundtrack 
 Hey-O-Hansen - Moon (Jack Is A Simple Fella Mix By Thaddi) 06:50
 Isolée - Krypt 06:53
 Pigon - Maria Durch Ein Dornwald Ging 07:27
 Gater - Taboo 04:17
 My My - Serpentine 07:58
 Seelenluft - Manila (Ewan Pearson Remix) 03:39
 D'NTEL - The Dream Of Evan And Chan (Superpitcher Remix) 07:06
 Keith Tucker - It's A Mood 05:04
 UND! - Cocopuffs 05:01
 Lopazz - I Need Ya 05:25
 DJ Naughty - Rojo Caliente 06:44
 Plastikman - Ping Pong
 Âme - Rej

See also
Resident Advisor

References

External links 
 
 Official Website
 News of the film's release on the website of the electronic dance music magazine/community, Resident Advisor.

2006 films
Documentary films about electronic music and musicians
2006 documentary films
Documentary films about Berlin
German documentary films
2000s German films